Pandanus obeliscus is a screwpine, or pandan endemic to Madagascar, Its common name is vacoua en pyramide. By reason of its very thick primary growth it may be the most massive (heaviest) of all pandans. P. obeliscus belongs to a section of the genus (acanthostyla) which are collectively called the "coniferoids" 
As these age, they fall away and are replaced by hundreds of side shoots with very much smaller leaves - six inches (15 centimeters) long by only about one-half inch (about one cm) in width. which are responsible for giving the tree its conifer-like appearance. The species was first described in 1808. These side branches frequently divide pseudodichotomously. Some taxonomists regard P. obeliscus and P. pulcher to be conspecific.

References

Plants described in 1808
obeliscus
Endemic flora of Madagascar
Taxa named by Louis-Marie Aubert du Petit-Thouars